The Nakano-kai (中野会) was a notorious Osaka-based yakuza gang, founded by Taro Nakano (born October 30, 1936 in Oita) in the years after World War 2. The Nakano-kai was known for its fierce bellicosity and thus sometimes dubbed the "Dojin-kai in the Yamaguchi-gumi".

Before 1997, the Nakano-kai had been an affiliate of the Kobe-based Yamaguchi-gumi, Japan's largest yakuza group.  But in July of that year, the Nakano-kai broke spectacularly from its parent in a violent attack that led to the group's disbanding.  

In August 1997, four Nakano-kai gunmen walked into the Oriental Hotel in Kobe and assassinated Masaru Takumi, number 2 in the Yamaguchi-gumi and the expected successor to Yoshinori Watanabe.   The Nakano-kai was reportedly angry at Takumi for ordering them to cease hostilities in a local Osaka gang war.  The attack also killed an innocent bystander, dentist Hiroshi Hirai.  Public outrage over the shooting led to a police crackdown and the arrest of many of the gang's members (however, two of the hotel gunmen are still at large as of 2005).  The gang was disbanded shortly thereafter.

References

Yakuza groups
Yamaguchi-gumi